The following lists events that happened during the 1730s in South Africa.

Events

1730
 The Dutch East India Company imports slaves from Mozambique and Zanzibar
 The first trekboers reach the George area, trek inland into Langkloof
 8 March - Jan de la Fontaine becomes Governor of the Cape Colony
 8 April - The first Jewish congregation consecrates their synagogue

1732
 The Trek Boers, the first Dutch farmers, settled along the Olifants River

1733
 Matthias Lotter, master Gold and Silver Smith arrives at the Cape.

1734
 Jan de la Fontaine, Governor of the Cape, claims Mossel Bay for the Dutch East India Company and the Great Brak River is proclaimed the eastern boundary of Cape

1736
 14 November Adriaan van Kervel is appointed Governor of the Cape
Phalo becomes King of the Xhosa Nation

1737
 21 May - Nine ships are wrecked in a gale in Table Bay with a loss of 208 lives
 9 July - George Schmidt, the first Protestant missionary (Moravian Brethren) in southern Africa, arrives at the Cape
 20 September - Daniël van den Henghel is appointed acting Governor of the Cape
 18 December - The first Moravian mission station in South Africa is established in Genadendal near present-day Caledon by George Schmidt, "The Apostle of the Hottentots"

1739
 1 March - Etienne Barbier's insurrection at Paarl
 1 April Hendrik Swellengrebel becomes the first South African-born governor when he is appointed Governor of the Cape

Deaths
 1733 - Willem Adriaan van der Stel, Governor of the Cape, dies
 1737 - Adriaan van Kervel, Governor of the Cape, dies

References
See Years in South Africa for list of References

History of South Africa